The Tropical Atlantic realm is one of twelve marine realms that cover the world's coastal seas and continental shelves.

The Tropical Atlantic covers both sides of the Atlantic. In the western Atlantic, it extends from Bermuda, southern Florida, and the southern Gulf of Mexico through the Caribbean and along South America's Atlantic coast to Cape Frio in Brazil's Rio de Janeiro state. In the Eastern Atlantic, it extends along the African coast from Cape Blanco in Mauritania to the Tigres Peninsula on the coast of Angola. It also includes the seas around St. Helena and Ascension islands.

The Tropical Atlantic is bounded on the north and south by temperate ocean realms. The Temperate Northern Atlantic realm lies to the north on both the North American and African-European shores of the Atlantic. To the south, the ocean realms conform to the continental margins, not the ocean basins; the Temperate South America realm lies to the south along the South American coast, and the Temperate Southern Africa realm lies to the south along the African coast.

Marine provinces
The Tropical Atlantic realm is divided into six marine provinces, which are in turn divided into 25 marine ecoregions.

Tropical Northwestern Atlantic

 Bermuda
 Bahamian
 Eastern Caribbean
 Greater Antilles
 Southern Caribbean
 Southwestern Caribbean
 Western Caribbean
 Southern Gulf of Mexico
 Floridian

North Brazil Shelf

 Guianian
 Amazonia

Tropical Southwestern Atlantic

 Sao Pedro and Sao Paulo Islands
 Fernando de Noronha and Atol das Rocas
 Northeastern Brazil
 Eastern Brazil
 Trindade and Martin Vaz Islands

Saint Helena, Ascension and Tristan da Cunha Islands

 Saint Helena, Ascension and Tristan da Cunha Islands

West African Transition

 Cape Verde
 Sahelian Upwelling

Gulf of Guinea

 Gulf of Guinea West
 Gulf of Guinea Upwelling
 Gulf of Guinea Central
 Gulf of Guinea Islands
 Gulf of Guinea South
 Angolan

References
 Spalding, Mark D., Helen E. Fox, Gerald R. Allen, Nick Davidson et al. "Marine Ecoregions of the World: A Bioregionalization of Coastal and Shelf Areas". Bioscience Vol. 57 No. 7, July/August 2007, pp. 573–583.

External links
 Marine Ecoregions of the World (WWF)

 
Marine realms
Atlantic Ocean